The Ourém Castle is a Portuguese castle in Ourém, Santarém. It has been listed as a National monument since 1910.

External links
Ourém Castle at IPPAR 

National monuments in Santarém District
Ourem
Buildings and structures in Ourém